Dame Alison Mariot Leslie,  (born 25 June 1954), known as Mariot Leslie, is a former British diplomat whose last post was Permanent Representative to NATO. When she was replaced at NATO it was announced that she would retire from the Diplomatic Service.

She was formerly director-general for defence and intelligence at the UK's Foreign and Commonwealth Office. She began her career in 1977 in the FCO Middle East Department and also held positions in Singapore, Bonn, Paris, Rome and Oslo.

Honours
She was appointed Commander of the Order of St Michael and St George (CMG) in the 2005 New Year Honours and Dame Commander of the Order of St Michael and St George (DCMG) in the 2012 Birthday Honours.

Leslie received an Honorary Doctorate from Heriot-Watt University in 2013. She was elected a Fellow of the Royal Society of Edinburgh in 2021.

Personal life
Born in Edinburgh in 1954, as Mariot Sanderson, she was educated at George Watson's Ladies College, Edinburgh, Leeds Girls' High School and St Hilda's College, Oxford (1972–75).

Sanderson married Andrew Leslie in 1978; the couple have two daughters.

Diplomatic career (1977-present)
 1977-1978: Joined the British Diplomatic Service; spent a year in the Middle East Department of the Foreign and Commonwealth Office, London (FCO)
 1978-1981: British High Commission, Singapore
 1982-1986: British Embassy, Bonn, as First Secretary with responsibility for the European Communities
 1986-1987: Policy Planning Staff, FCO
 1988-1990: Personnel Operations Department, FCO
 1990-1992: Seconded to the French Foreign Ministry, Quai d'Orsay, Paris
 1992-1993: Head of Environment, Science and Energy Department, FCO
 1993-1995: Scottish Office Industry Department, Edinburgh
 1996-1998: Head of Policy Planning Staff, FCO
 1998-2001: Minister and Deputy Head of Mission, British Embassy, Rome
 2002-2006: HM Ambassador, British Embassy, Oslo
 2006-2007: Director, Defence and Strategic Threats and Counter-Terrorism Envoy, FCO
 2007-2010: Director General Defence and Intelligence, FCO
 2010-2014:  HM Ambassador and Permanent Representative Joint Delegation of the UK to NATO

References

External links

 
 http://www.guardian.co.uk/uk/2012/jun/16/queens-birthday-honours-diplomatic
 http://www.europeanvoice.com/article/imported/movers-shakers/66750.aspx
 http://www.cdrex.com/alison-mariot-leslie/2292499.html

1954 births
Living people
Diplomats from Edinburgh
People educated at George Watson's College
People educated at Leeds Girls' High School
Alumni of St Hilda's College, Oxford
Members of HM Diplomatic Service
Ambassadors of the United Kingdom to Norway
Permanent Representatives of the United Kingdom to NATO
Dames Commander of the Order of St Michael and St George
British women ambassadors
Fellows of the Royal Society of Edinburgh
20th-century British diplomats